Morningside may refer to:

Places
Australia
Morningside, Queensland
Canada
Morningside, Alberta, a hamlet
Morningside, Toronto, a neighbourhood in Scarborough
Morningside Avenue (Toronto), a street in Scarborough
Morningside Park (Toronto), a park in Scarborough
South Africa
Morningside, Gauteng
Morningside, Durban
New Zealand
Morningside, Auckland, a suburb of Auckland
Morningside, Northland, a suburb of Whangarei
United Kingdom
Morningside, Edinburgh, Scotland
Morningside, North Lanarkshire, Scotland
United States
MorningSide, Detroit, a neighborhood within Detroit, Michigan
Morningside, Maryland, a town
Morningside (Miami), a neighborhood within the city of Miami, Florida
Morningside, Minnesota, a neighborhood in Edina, Minnesota
Morningside, Oregon, an area of Salem, Oregon
Morningside (Pittsburgh), Pennsylvania
 Morningside Park, neighborhood in Inglewood, California
Morningside, South Dakota, a census-designated place
Morningside (Maryville, Tennessee), a historic house
Morningside, Roanoke, Virginia
New York City:
Morningside Park (New York City), a park in Manhattan
Morningside Avenue (Manhattan), a street in Manhattan
Morningside Drive (Manhattan), a street in Manhattan

Schools
Morningside University, a private institution in Sioux City, Iowa, USA
Morningside College (Hong Kong), a college of the Chinese University of Hong Kong
Morningside High School, Inglewood, California, USA
Morningside High School, Port Elizabeth, South Africa

Other uses
Morningside (radio program), formerly a program on CBC Radio
Morningside Australian Football Club, Brisbane, Australia
"Morningside", a song by Neil Diamond on Moods
"Morningside", a song by Sara Bareilles from Little Voice 
Morningside Foundation, charitable foundation of real state tycoon T. H. Chan and family, a large-scale donor to the Harvard School of Public Health and the eponymous Morningside College (Hong Kong)